Frâncești is a commune located in Vâlcea County, Oltenia, Romania. It is composed of nine villages: Băluțoaia, Coșani, Dezrobiți, Frâncești, Genuneni, Mănăilești, Moșteni, Surpatele and Viișoara.

References

Communes in Vâlcea County
Localities in Oltenia